The 1973 Bulgarian Cup Final was the 33rd final of the Bulgarian Cup (in this period the tournament was named Cup of the Soviet Army), and was contested between CSKA Sofia and Beroe Stara Zagora on 3 June 1973 at Vasil Levski National Stadium in Sofia. CSKA won the final 2–1.

Match

Details

See also
1972–73 A Group

References

Bulgarian Cup finals
PFC CSKA Sofia matches
Cup Final